Axe Murder Boyz are an American hip hop duo from Denver, Colorado, United States best known as representatives of the horrorcore and gangsta rap subgenres. It consists of brothers Mike and James Garcia, who perform under the names Bonez Dubb and Young Wicked (or Otis), respectively. Their rap personae is loosely based on characters in the 2000 Bill Paxton horror movie Frailty, a film about two young brothers forced to become "demon Slayers" and participate in the brutal killings of evil creatures from hell living here on earth who look like normal people.

Background and beginnings (1999–2004)
The Axe Murder Boyz are originally from the West Denver area. James and Mike Garcia are brothers of a mother of Irish/Welsh descent and a father of Mexican-American descent. Axe Murder Boyz released a series of underground local releases on their own label, Axe Recordings, before creating Canonize Productions and releasing The Unforgiven Forest in 2004. They released their first album titled Tha Underground Stylistikz in 1999. They also released their second album titled How Far Will I Go? in 1999. They released their third album titled Tormented in 2000. In 2001 they released their fourth album, The Galaxy EP. In 2003 their fifth album titled The Down Low EP, and their sixth album titled Tha Underground Stylistikz Compilation Vol. 1. In 2004 their seventh album titled Vampirez EP was released. In November 2004 their eighth album titled The Unforgiven Forest was released.

Psychopathic Records (2005–2006)

Blood In, Blood Out Era (2006)
In 2005, AMB won the Underground Psychos contest held by Psychopathic Records. They released their ninth album titled Underdogz independently in 2005. Following a brief tour with Insane Clown Posse, they signed to Psychopathic Records in 2006, and released their tenth album and first national release titled Blood In, Blood Out. The album peaked at #11 on the Billboard Top Heatseekers chart, #22 on the Top Independent Albums chart, #199 on the Top Internet Albums chart and #199 on the Billboard 200.

Leaving Psychopathic Records and Canonize Productions (2007)
After the release of Blood In, Blood Out and a tour to support the album, AMB fulfilled their contract and departed from Psychopathic Records. They released their eleventh album titled Cutt & Stitched Vol. 1 in 2007.

Joining Hatchet House (2008–2011)

Gods Hand Era (2008–2010)
In 2008, the duo released their twelfth album titled Gods Hand through Canonize and Psychopathic subsidiary Hatchet House. The album peaked at #11 on the Top Heatseekers chart, and #36 on the Top Independent Albums chart.

Body In A Hole EP Era (2010–2011)
In 2010, Bonez Dubb and Otis appeared in the Psychopathic film Big Money Rustlas and released their thirteenth album, an EP titled Body In A Hole before leaving Hatchet House in early 2011.

Leaving Hatchet House (2011–2013)
After Body In A Hole EP was released, AMB left Hatchet House in early 2011 due to Young Wicked having personal problems. They released their fourteenth album titled Strictly 4 The Scrubs mixtape in 2011.

Return to Psychopathic Records (2013—2016)
At the 2013 Gathering of the Juggalos, Violent J announced AMB's return to Psychopathic Records. In an interview with yadamedia.net, Otis said that The Garcia Brothers would be released before Christmas.

The Garcia Brothers Era (2014—2016)
In the February 28, 2014 edition of the Hatchet Herald it was announced AMB's fifteenth album The Garcia Brothers would be released on March 25, 2014, and would include guest features from Insane Clown Posse, Anybody Killa and Big Hoodoo. AMB went on "The Family Remains Eternal Tour" in 2014 to promote the album, documenting footage on each tour date. During AMB's 2014 GOTJ seminar, it was announced that they would release Cutt & Stitched Vol. 2, possibly for free. Also it was announced that Otis would release a solo album on Psychopathic. During the AMB seminar at the GOTJ 2014 Young Wicked announced that he was no longer drinking alcohol anymore  after realizing alcohol was controlling his life. Otis was featured on Psychopathic's new supergroup The Killjoy Club's (Violent J, Shaggy 2 Dope, DJ Paul, Crunchy Black & Koopsta Knicca) debut album Reindeer Games on nearly every track, unofficially making him a member of the group. Otis was a main producer on Insane Clown Posse's sideshow EP to The Mighty Death Pop!, House Of Wax EP. In a December 2014 interview with DesertJuggalos.com, Otis announced that he was working on Young Wicked: The Mixxtape Vol. 2, and that it would be released for free. He also stated that his upcoming debut solo album Slaughter would be released in 2015, he would go on tour to support it, and that the album would feature AMB member Bonez Dubb. He indicated that he would like to collaborate with Tech N9ne, and Ed Sheeran.

Otis produced many songs on the albums The Marvelous Missing Link: Lost, and The Marvelous Missing Link: Found. In the booklet for The Marvelous Missing Link: Lost it was announced that Otis's debut solo album on the label would be released nationwide on September 1, 2015. In a recent promo for the album it was announced that Slaughter had been pushed back to a September 4, 2015 release date. On June 24, 2015, Otis released a promo flyer for Slaughter, but stated that it was not the final cover art for the album. On July 23, 2015, during their GOTJ seminar it was announced that the new AMB album title will be in the pamphlet in Young Wicked!s debut solo album Slaughter. It was also announced that it will be released in March 2016. Also it was said that Bonez' debut solo album will be released in 2016. Finally it was said that Otis will release a mixxtape and then a solo album over his own beats. In the pamphlet of Slaughter it was announced that AMB's new album would be called Muerte.

In March 2016, Bonez Dubb released his first single titled "I Can't Wait" which was accompanied by a music video. A week later he released his second single titled "Laid Back". In mid/late March he released his third single titled "Mobb Murda" featuring Canonize Productions artist Saint Decay. On March 31, 2016, the fourth and final single was released titled "You Ain't Real" featuring Young Lyte and Str8 Jacket. On June 17, 2016, it was announced by Bonez Dubb that he will be releasing a new clothing line called "Truth Clothing Company", he will release a new music video for the song "Laid Back", and lastly he will release a new mixtape titled: "Show Me The Truth". During the AMB seminar at the 2016 Gathering of the Juggalos it was announced that Young Wicked and Bonez Dubb would be releasing solo albums. Also it was announced that Cutt & Stitched Vol. 2 would be released soon. Finally it was announced that the new Axe Murder Boyz album titled Muerte will be released in mid 2017. On September 24, 2016, Young Wicked announced that he will be headlining his own Halloween Show in Denver, Colorado on October 31, 2016, and would feature J-Dirty. On September 25, 2016, Young Wicked released the rest of the Halloween Tour dates dubbed "Hallows Eve Slaughter Show" running from October 28, 2016, through October 31, 2016. Bonez Dubb and Mindshot will be the supporting acts for the mini tour. Also announced was a list of tour dates for the "Slaughter Tour" will be released soon. The tour is to support Young Wicked's debut solo album Slaughter which was released on September 4, 2015, via solely on Psychopathic Records. On November 17, 2016, it was announced that Str8Jaket was the new in-house engineer for Psychopathic Records creating speculation if Young Wicked is a producer/engineer on the label or has been fired. Young Wicked is scheduled to perform at Twiztid's New Years Evil 9 and Twiztid's release party for The Continuous Evilution Of Life's ?'s on January 27, 2017, at The Roxy in Denver, Colorado with Boondox. Bonez Dubb is setting up a tour with Native World Inc.'s Kegan Ault. The tour is called The Wicked Wild West Tour. On December 31, 2016, it was announced that Young Wicked has signed to Majik Ninja Entertainment and has 2 new shirts available on Twiztid-Shop, as well as a brand new CD available titled, Vengeance EP, cementing the speculation that he had been let go and had left Psychopathic Records.

Signing to Majik Ninja Entertainment (2016–present)
On December 31, 2016, it was announced that Young Wicked has signed to Majik Ninja Entertainment. He released a CD titled Vengeance EP, and it featured Twiztid and Bonez Dubb.

On January 1, 2017, Young Wicked and Bonez Dubb were both invited to the Juggalo March On Washington. On January 4, 2017, via Majik Ninja Entertainment Facebook account it was announced that none of the artists on the label would take part in the March, but would be at the 2017 Juggalo Day Show: Tales From The Lotus Pod. With Young Wicked not performing at the March, AMB too will not take part. It is unknown if Bonez Dubb will take part or not. On January 5, 2017, the flyer for Twiztid's 5th Annual 420 Show was released. The show will feature sets from Twiztid, Blaze Ya Dead Homie, Boondox, G-Mo Skee, The R.O.C., Lex "The Hex" Master, Gorilla Voltage and Axe Murder Boyz. On January 5, 2017, it was announced that Young Wicked will be the father to Samantha Bruce's daughter. Samantha is the daughter of Jumpsteady, and the niece of Violent J and Myzery. Violent J Claimed, on an interview on faygoluvers called the "ICP's Exclusive Tell-All Interview" that Young Wicked dating samantha was gross and crossed the line; this betrayal was the final swing of the division Axe between Twiztid and ICP. The split between psychopathic and magic ninja entertainment has soaked into the fabric of juggalo relationships. within any subculture the outliers are sometimes the loudest and they have begun to pick sides. On January 18, 2017, it was announced that AMB will release their debut album on the label MNE in 2017. On March 1, 2017, during Monoxide Child's Brunch & Bake he stated that during the Eat Your Heart Out Tour in February everyone caught a bug and had been feeling under the weather, and in doing so that had delayed him recording his verse for Young Wicked's album and had probably delayed the release. On April 7, 2017, Young Wicked took to social media to post the tracklist for his upcoming album and the release date still scheduled for May 19, 2017. The official release date was pushed back to June 30, 2017.

Muerte Era (2018–present)
With the album being announced at the 2015 Gathering of the Juggalos, the anticipation for the album was very high coming off the unexpected bombshell of The Garcia Brothers. With Young Wicked jumping ship and leaving Psychopathic Records to join Majik Ninja Entertainment, it was expected that the album would be released in 2017. With no word on the album, other than "coming soon", expectations for a 2017 release began dwindling until the "Thank You Video" from Majik Ninja Entertainment stating that the album will be released in 2018, after Last American Rock Stars (King Gordy & Bizarre) release their debut full-length album on the label titled Last American Rock Stars on January 26, 2018 (later pushed back to February 16, 2018), and before G-Mo Skee's album Chaly & The Filth Factory. On April 25, 2018, Young Wicked "leaked" the cover art for AMB's fourth studio album Muerte, saying that the sampler and release date would be released soon. Following the leak,on April 29th, a promotional video titled "Muerte is coming" was released stating the album would be available on all platforms on June 15, 2018.

Discography 

Blood In, Blood Out (April 18, 2006) (Canonize Productions/Psychopathic Records)
Gods Hand (September 16, 2008) (Canonize Records/Hatchet House)
Body In A Hole EP (November 30, 2010) (Canonize Productions/Hatchet House)
The Garcia Brothers (March 25, 2014) (Canonize Productions/Psychopathic Records)
Muerte (June 15, 2018) (Canonize Productions/Majik Ninja Entertainment)
 Fatality EP (May 29, 2020) (Canonize Productions/Majik Ninja Entertainment)

Young Wicked
Young Wicked: The Mixtape Vol. 1 (February 2013) (Canonize Productions)
Slaughter (September 4, 2015) (Psychopathic Records)
Vengeance EP (December 31, 2016) (Majik Ninja Entertainment)
The Return Of The Prodigal Son (June 30, 2017) (Majik Ninja Entertainment)
Activated (as James Garcia) (August 26, 2021)(Majik Ninja Entertainment/Canonize Productions)

Bonez Dubb
Fresh 4: Singles (2016) ("I Can't Wait", "Laid Back", "You Aint Real" Ft. Young Lyte & Str8jaket, & "Mobb Murda" Ft. Saint Decay) (Canonize Productions)
Show Me The Truth: Mixtape (2021) (Majik Ninja Entertainment/Canonize Productions)

References

External links 
 

American hip hop groups
Musical groups established in 1999
Gangsta rap groups
Horrorcore groups
West Coast hip hop groups
Hatchet House artists
Majik Ninja Entertainment artists
Psychopathic Records artists
Underground hip hop groups
Sibling musical duos
American musical duos
Hip hop duos
1999 establishments in Colorado